Barrington Tabb (born 1934 in Almondsbury in Gloucestershire, England), is an English painter. He is a Royal West of England Academy (RWA) member.  Tabb has lived his whole life in and around Bristol.

Tabb is entirely self-taught after a short time at art school. He paints the docks, streets, pubs and parks of Bristol.

Several of his paintings are in public collections, including the RWA.

Throughout the 1950s he exhibited at the Clifton Arts Club and in 1976 in Davos, Switzerland. His paintings have been exhibited regularly at the RWA Autumn exhibitions and also with the Bath Society of Artists. He has had several solo shows with Anthony Hepworth Fine Art in Bath as well as with the Christopher Hull Gallery and Sue Rankin Galleries in London. In 1997 he had a solo show at the Black Swan Guild in Frome.

Tabb has been represented by Cube Gallery in Bristol for many years.

References

External links
 

1934 births
Living people
20th-century English painters
English male painters
21st-century English painters
Members of the Royal West of England Academy
Artists from Bristol
20th-century English male artists
21st-century English male artists